Euseby Cleaver (8 September 1745 – 10 December 1819) was the Church of Ireland Bishop of Ferns and Leighlin (1789–1809) in Ireland and subsequently Archbishop of Dublin (1809-1819).

Life
He was of Buckinghamshire origin, the younger son of the Reverend William Cleaver, who ran a school at Twyford, and his wife Martha Lettice Lushden. He was educated at Westminster School and Christ Church, Oxford, graduating B.A. in 1767, M.A. in 1770, B.D. and D.D. in 1783.

In 1774, he was presented to the rectory of Spofforth, North Yorkshire, which he held till 1783, when Lord Egremont, whose tutor he had been, presented him to the rectories of Tillington, West Sussex and Petworth. He was briefly Bishop of Cork and Ross, before in 1789 being translated to Ferns and Leighlin.

During the 1798 insurrection in Ireland his palace in Ferns was ransacked and Cleaver was obliged to take refuge in Beaumaris, Anglesey which was in his brother, William Cleaver's diocese of Bangor, Gwynedd, where he lived at what is now the Bishopsgate Hotel.

His exercise of the Archbishopric of Dublin was cut short for reasons of alleged insanity. He appears to have favoured the use of the Irish language.

Family
He married Catherine Wynne of Hazelwood, County Sligo, by whom he had several children, including William, Frances and Caroline; Caroline married Admiral James William King, and was the mother of the prominent evangelist Catherine Pennefather. The Archbishop's wife died on 1 May 1816. His brother William Cleaver was successively bishop of Chester and (1800) bishop of Bangor.

References

Attribution

1745 births
1819 deaths
People educated at Westminster School, London
Alumni of Christ Church, Oxford
Bishops of Ferns and Leighlin
Anglican archbishops of Dublin
Members of the Privy Council of Ireland
Bishops of Cork and Ross (Church of Ireland)